Monowai may refer to:
Lake Monowai, a lake in New Zealand
Monowai Seamount, a volcanic seamount north of New Zealand
HMNZS Monowai (F59), an armed merchant cruiser commissioned in 1940
HMNZS Monowai (A06), a hydrographic survey vessel commissioned in 1977

See also
HMNZS Monowai, a list of Royal New Zealand Navy vessels